Thomas Jefferson (1743–1826) was the president of the United States from 1801 to 1809.

Thomas Jefferson may also refer to:

People
Thomas Jefferson (athlete) (born 1962), American athlete who competed mainly in the 200 meters
Thomas Jefferson (Caymanian politician) (1941–2006)
Thomas Jefferson (musician) (1920–1986), American Dixieland jazz trumpeter
Tom Jefferson (epidemiologist), British epidemiologist
Thomas Jefferson (actor) (1856–1932), American actor
Thomas Garland Jefferson (1847-1864), VMI cadet killed at the Battle of New Market
Thomas Jefferson Byrd (1950–2020), American actor

Fictional characters
Thomas "Tommy" Jefferson, a character from Harry's Law

Arts and entertainment
Thomas Jefferson: Author of America, a short biography by Christopher Hitchens
Thomas Jefferson (film), a 1997 film by Ken Burns

Sculptures
Thomas Jefferson (Bitter), a 1915 sculpture by Karl Bitter in Cleveland, Ohio
Statue of Thomas Jefferson (Columbia University), a 1914 sculpture by William Ordway Partridge in Manhattan, New York
Thomas Jefferson (University of Virginia), a statue in front of the Rotunda

Ships
, a U.S. Navy shipname
USS Thomas Jefferson (APA-30), an attack transport in service from 1941 to 1949
USS Thomas Jefferson (SSBN-618), an Ethan Allen-class ballistic missile submarine commissioned in 1963
NOAAS Thomas Jefferson (S 222), a United States National Oceanic and Atmospheric Administration hydrographic survey ship

Schools

Thomas Jefferson Junior High School (disambiguation)
Thomas Jefferson Middle School (disambiguation)
Thomas Jefferson University, Philadelphia, Pennsylvania
Thomas Jefferson School of Law, San Diego, California

Other uses
Thomas Jefferson Association Building, Brooklyn, New York, demolished in 1960
Thomas Jefferson Hotel, a former hotel in Birmingham, Alabama
Thomas Jefferson Library, the main library for the University of Missouri–St. Louis
Thomas Jefferson National Accelerator Facility, a national laboratory in Newport News, Virginia

See also

Jefferson (disambiguation)
Thomas (disambiguation)

Jefferson, Thomas